Manticora tuberculata is a species of tiger beetle native to Angola (Kajambo), Namibia, South Africa (western Cape Colony).

External links
Cicindelidae of Namibia

Cicindelidae
Beetles described in 1778